The 4th constituency of Deux-Sèvres was a French legislative constituency in the Deux-Sèvres département. It was abolished in the 2010 redistricting of French legislative constituencies. At the 2007 French legislative election, the seat was won by Jean Grellier of the Socialist and associated group.

References 

Defunct French legislative constituencies
Deux-Sèvres